FC Bayern Alzenau is a German football club based in Alzenau, Bavaria. They currently are in the Hessenliga.

History
The club was initially formed as Alzenauer Fußball Club and joined gymnastics club Turn- und Sport Alzenau as that club's football department on 16 September 1922 before again becoming independent in 1923 as FC Bayern Alzenau. After World War II the club was re-established as SKG Alzenau before again taking on its pre-war name in 1947.

Since 1983 the club has played as a fifth tier side, first in the Landesliga Bayern-Nord and later in the Landesliga Hessen-Süd. Like the nearby club Viktoria Aschaffenburg, FC Bayern Alzenau is a Bavarian side playing in the state league of Hesse against closer, neighbouring cities. This also reflects in part the history of the region, not traditionally part of Bavaria. The club slipped as low as the Bezirksliga Gelnhausen (VII) in 1998 before working its way back up. The team enjoyed its greatest sporting success with promotion to the Hessenliga (IV) in 2006 after a second place Landesliga finish and subsequent advance through the promotion playoffs.

In 2008–09, FC Bayern Alzenau achieved promotion to the Regionalliga Süd despite coming second behind SC Waldgirmes, as only two clubs applied for a Regionalliga license, Alzenau and Rot-Weiss Frankfurt. Alzenau was unable to survive at this level however, coming last in the Regionalliga and being relegated again immediately, back to the Hessenliga.

After another promotion in 2011, back to the Regionalliga, the club was grouped into the new Regionalliga Südwest at the end of the 2011–12 season, a league which replaced the Regionalliga Süd in the region. At this level it lasted for only one season before being relegated back to the Hessenliga.

Honours

League
 Hessenliga (V)
 Champions: 2011
 Runners-up: 2009
 Landesliga Hessen-Süd (V)
 Runners-up: 2005
 Bezirksliga Unterfranken West (V)
 Champions: 1982

Cup
 Lower Frankonian Cup
 Winners: 1982

Recent seasons
The recent season-by-season performance of the club:

 With the introduction of the Regionalligas in 1994 and the 3. Liga in 2008 as the new third tier, below the 2. Bundesliga, all leagues below dropped one tier. In 2012, the number of Regionalligas was increased from three to five with all Regionalliga Süd clubs except the Bavarian ones entering the new Regionalliga Südwest.

References

External links
 Official website  
 FC Bayern Alzenau profile at Weltfussball.de 

Association football clubs established in 1920
Football clubs in Germany
Football clubs in Bavaria
Football clubs in Hesse
Football in Lower Franconia
1920 establishments in Germany